East Allen University (EAU) is a high school within the East Allen County School system in Indiana. Part of the former Paul Harding High School (a traditional grade 7 through 12 junior high / high school), EAU was formed in 2012 after a reorganization that saw the senior high school (grades 9 through 12) divided from the newly created Paul Harding Junior High School (grades 7 and 8).

Not a university in the traditional sense, the name East Allen University refers to the program offered in which students may obtain both a high school diploma and an associate's degree within the four year (grades 9 - 12) program. The associate degree is granted in partnership with Vincennes University, and the credits earned can transfer to any public university within the state of Indiana.

See also
 List of high schools in Indiana

References

External links
 East Allen University website
 East Allen County Schools website

Schools in Fort Wayne, Indiana
Public high schools in Indiana
Educational institutions established in 2012
2012 establishments in Indiana